The 2020 League of Ireland First Division season was the 36th season of the League of Ireland First Division. The league began on 21 February 2020 and concluded on 27 October 2020. Drogheda United won the league title for a record 5th time, winning promotion to the League of Ireland Premier Division for 2021.				
  The Coronavirus pandemic in Ireland halted the season in mid-March as per directive of the Irish Government and the Football Association of Ireland.  On 13 July 2020, the league announced the season restart with a reduced fixture list of two rounds only (18 games in total, per team for the regular season) and the play-off series as announced pre-season.

Overview
The First Division has 10 teams. Each team plays each other three times for a total of 27 matches in the season. This format was changed after the league was postponed during the COVID-19 pandemic meaning each team would now play each other only two times, once home and once away. UCD were relegated from the 2019 League of Ireland Premier Division.  A reserve side of Shamrock Rovers F.C. competed in place of the Limerick team that encountered financial difficulty prior to the commencement of the season.
Drogheda United finished top of the league table after a 2–0 away win over Cabinteely sealed the league title and promotion to the League Of Ireland Premier Division for 2021. It was the Drogs' record 5th First Division title.
Wexford FC were wrongly applied forfeits in four games by the FAI, which was subsequently overturned and results restored.

Teams

Stadia and locations

Personnel and kits

Note: Flags indicate national team as has been defined under FIFA eligibility rules. Players may hold more than one non-FIFA nationality.

Managerial changes

League table

Results

Matches 1–18

Teams play each other twice (once at home, once away). Wexford were wrongly applied a forfeit in four matches, which was subsequently overturned.

Season statistics

Top scorers

Play-offs

First Division play-off Semi-finals

First Division play-off Final

Promotion/relegation play-off

See also
 2020 League of Ireland Premier Division
 2020 FAI Cup
 2020 League of Ireland Cup

References

 
League of Ireland First Division seasons
2020 League of Ireland
2
Ireland
Ireland